Harvey Cribb (born 21 January 2006) is an English professional footballer who plays as a midfielder for Scunthorpe United.

Club career
Cribb began his career with Scunthorpe United and made his professional debut on 26 February 2022 in a 4–1 defeat away at Sutton United. He became Scunthorpe's youngest player at the age of 16 years and 36 days.

Career statistics

References

2006 births
Living people
English footballers
Scunthorpe United F.C. players
Association football forwards
English Football League players